Tyler Cassel (born 1 March 1995) is a Malta & Scotland international rugby league footballer who plays as a  and .

Background
Cassel was born in Sydney, New South Wales, Australia

Playing career

International career
Cassel made his international début for Scotland in their 2016 Four Nations game against England.

He is also a Maltese international

References

1995 births
Living people
Australian rugby league players
Australian people of Maltese descent
Australian people of Scottish descent
Malta national rugby league team players
Scotland national rugby league team players
Rugby league second-rows
Rugby league players from Sydney